Rajneesh (1931–1990) was an Indian mystic and guru with an international following. Rajneesh or Rajnish may also refer to:

Antelope, Oregon, a small town in Oregon that was renamed to "Rajneesh" in 1984 and then renamed back to "Antelope" in 1985
Rajneeshpuram, a former intentional community established near Antelope, Oregon, by members of the Rajneesh movement
Byron v. Rajneesh Foundation International, a 1985 lawsuit  against the Rajneesh Foundation International
Campbell Court Hotel, a historic hotel in Oregon that was bombed in 1983 while operating as Hotel Rajneesh
Rajneesh movement, a new religious movement based on the teachings of Rajneesh

People
Rajneesh Duggal, an Indian model and actor
Rajneesh Harvansh Singh, an Indian politician
Rajneesh Narula, a British economist
Rajneesh Chopra 1974 Indian former cricketer
Rajneesh Gurbani 1993  Indian cricketer
Rajnish Kumar (banker), an Indian banker
Rajnish Kumar (peace activist), an Indian peace activist
Rajnish Kumar (politician), an Indian politician
Rajnish Mehra, an Indian-American economist